The Game & Wildlife Conservation Trust (formerly the Game Conservancy Trust) is a British charitable organisation promoting game and wildlife management as a part of nature conservation, whilst working with the shooting and hunting community. For over 75 years the Trust has been conducting scientific research to understand why there have been declines in species such as the grey partridge, black grouse, water vole, corn bunting and brown hare.

The Trust advises conservationists, farmers and land managers on ways to improve wildlife habitat and enhance the countryside for public benefit. It also lobbies government for agricultural and conservation policies based on science.

Notable conservation projects of the Trust are those conserving grey partridges, black grouse and regarding control of mink where they are preying on water voles.

History

A severe outbreak of the disease strongylosis in grey partridges in 1931 led Major HG Eley (a shotgun cartridge manufacturer) to establish the ICI Game Research Station at Knebworth in Hertfordshire. The organisation monitored partridge numbers and investigated their biology.

After the war, Eley established a new base at Burgate Manor in Fordingbridge, Hampshire, establishing what was later known as the Eley Game Advisory Service. They leased a local  estate and for 14 years ran it as a demonstration and experimental game shoot.

Much of the association's early work was on organochlorine pesticides and this work helped to bring in a ban on the use of dieldrin, aldrin and heptachlor seed dressings in 1962. In April 1980, the organisation was registered as a research and education charity under the name The Game Conservancy Trust.

Name change
On 1 October 2007, after 27 years as the Game Conservancy Trust, the organisation was renamed to the Game & Wildlife Conservation Trust, to reflect that it works to conserve a wider range of wildlife other than game animals.

Conservation
The Game & Wildlife Conservation Trust works on the following species and habitats:

 Grey partridge
 Black grouse
 Red grouse
 Capercaillie
 Ptarmigan
 Eurasian woodcock
 Brown hare
 Atlantic salmon
 Brown trout
 Farmland birds such as yellowhammer, song thrush and corn bunting
 Chalk streams
 Farmland
 Field margins
 Heather moorland

The Trust is one of the pioneers in research into conservation headlands and beetle banks.

Research
The Trust has conducted and published research on countryside and game management, on topics such as numbers of gamebirds, disease in gamebirds, predator control and farming practices. It also publishes peer-reviewed papers in scientific journals.

See also
 Hunting in the United Kingdom
 Game (food)
 British Association for Shooting and Conservation

References

External links
 Website

Video clips
 

Environmental organisations based in the United Kingdom
Ornithological organizations
Hunting and shooting in the United Kingdom
Organizations established in 1931
Organisations based in Hampshire
1931 establishments in the United Kingdom